Pulau may refer to:

Pulau virus (PuV), a novel strain of Nelson Bay orthoreovirus species
Pulau River,  a river of West Papua and Papua New Guinea
Pulau (film), a 2023 Malaysian horror film

See also
List of islands of Malaysia – "Pulau" means "island" in the Malay language
Pulao (disambiguation)
Palau (disambiguation)